The Communications Museum is a museum in Nossa Senhora de Fátima, Macau, China.

History
The museum was inaugurated on 1 March 2006.

Exhibitions
The museum displays various artifacts and equipment about the evolution of long-distance communication systems and techniques, history of Macau Post, scientific exhibits on various technology etc. The museum building consists of Post/Philately Area and Telecommunications Area for its exhibition venues.

See also
 List of museums in Macau

References

External links

 

2006 establishments in Macau
Macau Peninsula
Museums established in 2006
Museums in Macau
Postal history of China